Ahmed Nihan Hussain Manik is a Maldivian politician and the former parliament member from Capital Male’  for two Consecutive Villimaafannu Constituency ( 2009 - 2014) Villimale’ Constituency ( 2014 - 2019) Terms. He was the majority Leader of the 18th People's Majlis sitting and the deputy leader of the Progressive Party of Maldives.

MP Nihan later joined the Jumhoory Party after the 2018 Maldivian presidential election.

References

Members of the People's Majlis
Living people
Year of birth missing (living people)
People from Malé